This page lists all the confirmed and probable tornadoes which have touched down in Canadian provinces & territories.

On average, around 60 confirmed tornadoes touch down in Canada each year despite experts estimating closer to 200 tornadoes each year, with most occurring in Southern Ontario, the southern Canadian Prairies and southern Quebec. Canada ranks as the second country in the world with the most tornadoes per year, after the United States of America. Of the average 60 confirmed tornadoes each year, Alberta and Saskatchewan both average between 14 and 18 tornadoes per season, followed by Manitoba and Ontario with normally between 8 and 14 tornadoes per season. Quebec is another recognized tornado-prone zone averaging between 4 and 8 tornadoes each year. Atlantic Canada and Interior British Columbia are also recognized tornado zones averaging between 0 and 4 tornadoes each year. The Canadian Territories are not typically seen as tornado-prone regions, however tornadoes can occur in the region. The peak season for tornadoes and severe thunderstorms in Canada is in the summer months, although tornadoes in Canada have occurred in spring, fall and very rarely winter.

In Canada, tornadoes are rated based on the damage they cause using a set of "Damage Indicators" which estimate wind speeds based on different levels of damage. Prior to April 1, 2013, the scale used to rate tornadoes in Canada was the Fujita scale. Following this day, Environment Canada started to use the Enhanced Fujita scale. The most common intensities for tornadoes in Canada range between an EF0 to EF2 (F0 to F2) and usually result in minor structural damage to barns, wood fences, roof shingles, uprooted or snapped tree limbs and downed power lines. Tornadoes rated at an EF3 to EF4 (F3 to F4) have occurred in Canada, but are significantly rarer. Canada has only ever see one EF5 (F5) tornado which occurred in Elie, Manitoba.

Due to increasing detection (i.e. Doppler weather radar, social media and satellite imagery), the number of confirmed tornadoes have increased substantially in recent years. In past decades, the number of tornadoes officially counted is likely underestimated. The uptick in confirmed tornadoes is also attributed to other factors, such as improved aerial and ground damage assessment after the fact in sparsely populated areas (particularly the case in remote parts of the Canadian Prairies and Northern Ontario, for example), better trained spotter capabilities and increased use of digital recording devices by citizens. In Canada, the Northern Tornadoes Project from Western University has taken over the survey, rating, and confirmation of tornadoes in Canada.

For a variety of reasons, such as Canada's lower population density and generally stronger housing construction due to the colder climate, Canadian tornadoes have historically caused far fewer fatalities than tornadoes in other parts of the world.

Tornadoes in Canada are enough of a threat for a public warning system to be in place, overseen by the national weather agency, Environment and Climate Change Canada (ECCC). With connections between Environment Canada and the Government of Canada, AlertReady is used for the public alerting method for various public hazards.

Alberta

List of Alberta tornadoes

1880s

1893 

 July 14 - An unrated tornado touched down in Medicine Hat, Alberta resulting in damage to nearby buildings.

1890s

1893 

 April 4 - An unrated tornado touched down in Lethbridge, Alberta resulting in damage to local store fronts.

1897 

 Between July 13–19 - An unrated tornado touched down between Lothaire, Alberta and Wheatland County, Alberta resulting in minor tree damage and a destroyed barn roof.

1900s

1905 

 July 12 - An unrated tornado touched down near Pine Lake, Alberta, southeast of Red Deer, Alberta resulting in significant, but narrow damage. Various farm properties sustained damage with a house losing its roof and nearby buildings remaining untouched. The track of the tornado could be seen through fields and forests. The tornado briefly became a tornadic waterspout as it crossed Pine Lake.

1906 

 October 29 - An unrated tornado touched down near the International Border with the United States in Coutts, Alberta. The tornado tore a corner of the Campbell's Blacksmith Shop, destroyed chimneys, and blew over a windmill owned by the Great Northern Railway of Canada.

1907 

The tornado struck and a destroyed a house, stables and corrals. Three children died.

1909 

 July 1 - An unrated tornado touched down near Didsbury, Alberta.
Four people were injured.

1910s

1911 

 March 13 - An unrated tornado touched down near Macleod, Alberta resulting in minor damage to structures. The tornado occurred after a week-long Chinook.
 June 30 - An unrated tornado touched down near Winnifred, Alberta. The tornado did considerable damage to barns and homes, completely destroying a 10x60 barn and twisting farm machinery.
Week before July 10 - An unrated tornado touched down near Strome, Alberta resulting in minimal damage to a couple windows and small barns. The tornado only lasted a few seconds.
 August 11 - An unrated tornado touched down in Black Diamond, Alberta resulting in major damage. A granary was picked up shredded apart. The tornado was accompanied by large and damaging hail.

1915 

 June 25 - An unrated tornado touched down causing widespread destruction in Grassy Lake, Alberta and Redcliff, Alberta. The industrial section in Redcliff, Alberta was the worst impacted with the tornado levelling the newly built knitting mill, the town's rolling mill and the cigar factory with other factories receiving substantial damage. Houses across the community were badly damaged with roofs collapsed and ripped off and walls collapsing in. A fright train was also blown off the tracks. In Grassy Lake, Alberta, the business section was destroyed with two lumber yards wiped out. According to the Medicine Hat News from June 26, 1915, there were five deaths in total from the tornado with three occurring in Grassy Lake, Alberta and no deaths in Redcliff, Alberta. They also report four injuries in Redcliff, Alberta. Other sources indicate that the deaths range from zero to two and that the injuries range from twelve to 'many'.
The front of the school was badly damaged.

List of Alberta tornado strengths

British Columbia

List of British Columbia tornadoes

List of British Columbia tornado strengths

Manitoba

List of Manitoba tornadoes

List of Manitoba tornado strengths

New Brunswick

List of New Brunswick tornadoes

List of New Brunswick tornado strengths

Newfoundland and Labrador

List of Newfoundland and Labrador tornadoes

List of Newfoundland and Labrador tornado strengths

Northwest Territories

List of Northwest Territories tornadoes

List of Northwest Territories tornado strengths

Nova Scotia

List of Nova Scotia tornadoes

List of Nova Scotia tornado strengths

Nunavut

List of Nunavut tornadoes

List of Nunavut tornado strengths

Ontario

List of Ontario tornadoes

2018-2019

2020s

Summary of Ontario tornado strengths per year

Prince Edward Island

List of Prince Edward Island tornadoes

1980s

2000s

Summary of Prince Edward Island tornado strengths per year

Quebec

List of Quebec tornadoes

List of Quebec tornado strengths

Saskatchewan

List of Saskatchewan tornadoes

List of Saskatchewan tornado strengths

Yukon

List of Yukon tornadoes

List of Yukon tornado strengths

Records and facts

Canada's deadliest tornadoes

Canada's F5 / EF5 tornadoes

Canada's largest tornado outbreaks 

 Based on total tornadoes, not the strongest tornado
 At least 8 tornadoes

Media

Footnotes 

 All figures for damages are in Canadian dollars.
 Prior to 2013, the Fujita system was used.
 Following 2013, the Enhanced Fujita system was and is being used.
 '~' indicates the number is around the real value

Tornado rating strengths

Fujita Scale

Enhanced Fujita Scale

See also 
 Tornado Alley
 List of Canadian tornadoes and tornado outbreaks
 List of 21st-century Canadian tornadoes and tornado outbreaks

References 



 List
Canada, Province